= Stimmersee =

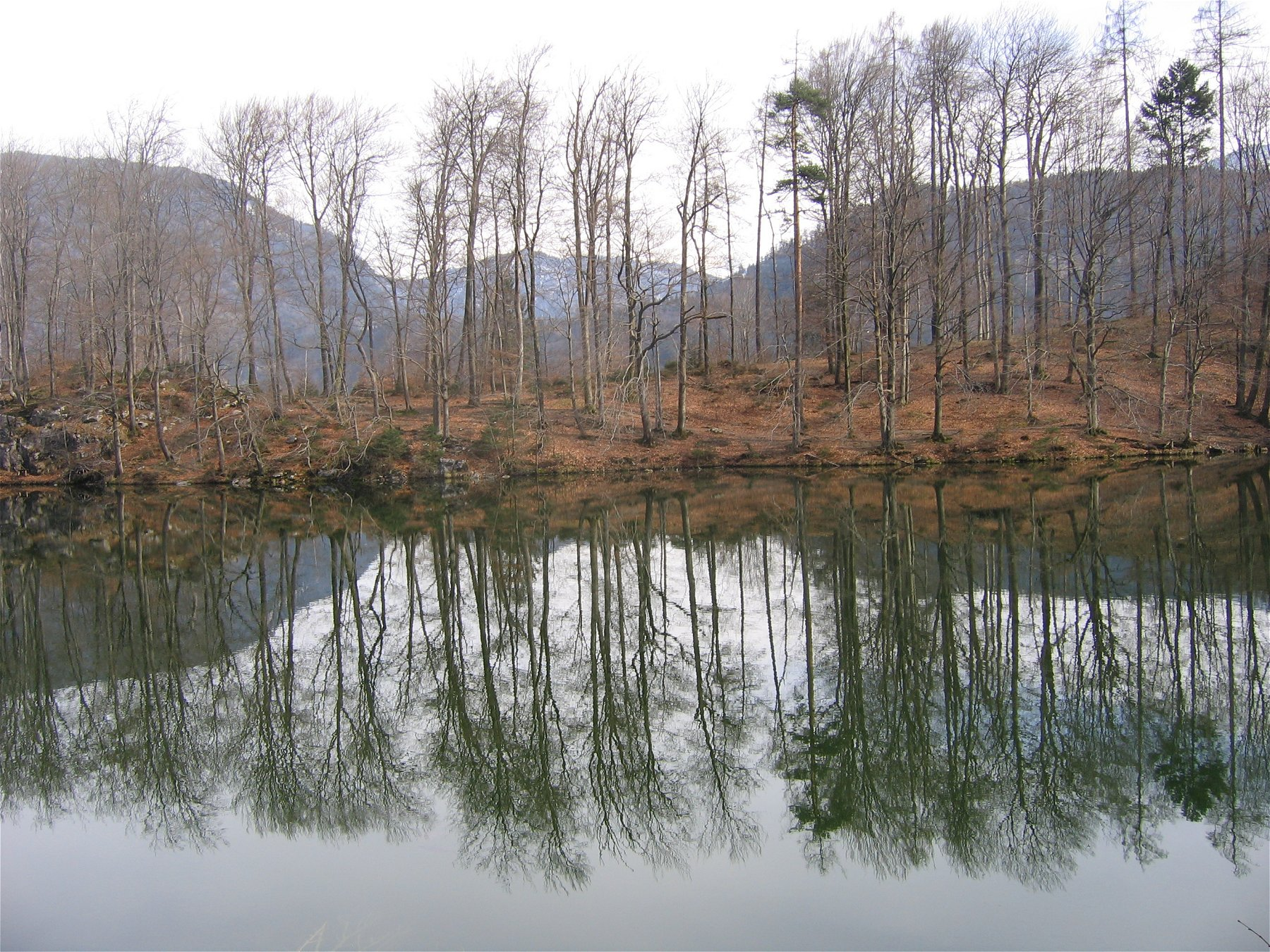

- Location within Austria
- Location: Tyrol, Austria
- Coordinates: 47°34′18″N 12°08′01″E
- Type: lake

Stimmersee is a lake of Tyrol, Austria.
